Tetrapanax papyrifer, the rice-paper plant (通草—tong cao), is an evergreen shrub in the family Araliaceae, the sole species in the genus Tetrapanax. The specific epithet is frequently misspelled as "papyriferum", "papyriferus", or "papyrifera". It is endemic to Taiwan, but widely cultivated in East Asia and sometimes in other tropical regions as well. The species was once included in the genus Fatsia as Fatsia papyrifera.

A second species, Tetrapanax tibetanus, is now regarded as a synonym of Merrilliopanax alpinus.

Description
Tetrapanax grows between 3–7 metres tall, usually with unbranched stems 2 cm in diameter, and bearing a rosette of large leaves atop the crown; the top of the plant can visually, albeit superficially, appear similar to a number of plants belonging to Arecaceae (the palm family). The leaves are carried on 40–60 cm petioles; the orbicular leaf blade measures from 30–50 cm across, with anywhere from 5-12 deeply palmately lobes, the central lobes being larger and Y-forked near the end. It spreads extensively, by sprouts and runners from the root system, underground. The inflorescence is a large panicle of hemispherical or globular umbels, at the end of the stem. The flowers have 4-6 small, white petals. The fruit is a small berry.

Uses
Tetrapanax papyrifer is used in traditional Chinese medicine. The pith from the stem is used to make a substance commonly known as rice paper, but more properly termed pith paper.

The species is cultivated as an ornamental specimen plant, and has received the Royal Horticultural Society's Award of Garden Merit.

Cultivars
The cultivar 'Rex' is a semi-evergreen shrub or tree with huge palmate leaves. Classified by the Royal Horticultural Society as H4, it is evergreen in mild locations, deciduous where temperatures fall below freezing, and herbaceous with more prolonged freezing. It prefers a sheltered position in full sun or partial shade.

Gallery

References

External links

 Chinese Botanical Paintings, Tetrapanax papyriferum (Hook.) Koch

Araliaceae
Monotypic Apiales genera
Endemic flora of Taiwan